Irma Evangelina Cedeño Rascón (born December 28, 1989), known professionally as Eva Cedeño, is a Mexican actress. She is known for playing the role of Elena Villaseñor in the telenovela Te doy la vida.

Biography 
Cedeño began her career in 2011 as a TV host for Teledición Hermosillo. In 2013, Cedeño competed in the Nuestra Belleza Jalisco pageant. In 2014, she began to study acting at the Centro de Educación Artística of Televisa. Cedeño made her acting debut in the 2015 telenovela A que no me dejas, where she played the role of Odette. In 2020, she landed her first telenovela lead role in Te doy la vida, portraying Elena Villaseñor.

Filmography

Film roles

Television roles

References

External links 
 

1989 births
Living people
Mexican telenovela actresses
Mexican television actresses
Actresses from Sonora
People from Hermosillo
21st-century Mexican actresses